Christina Crawford is an American author and actress, best known for her 1978 memoir and exposé, Mommie Dearest, which described her abusive relationship with her adoptive mother, film star Joan Crawford.

Early life and education
Christina Crawford was born in Los Angeles, California, to an unmarried teen. According to her personal interview with Larry King, her father was married to another woman and supposedly in the Navy. Crawford was adopted from a baby broker in Nevada because Joan was formally denied an adoption by social services for being an unfit candidate in California in 1940. 

Christina was one of five children adopted by Joan. Her siblings were Christopher, adopted in 1943, and twin girls Catherine (Cathy) and Cynthia (Cindy) — adopted in 1947. In 1942, another boy, who also had the name Christopher, had been adopted by Joan Crawford, but was reclaimed by his birth mother.

After graduating from Flintridge Sacred Heart Academy, she moved from California to Pittsburgh to attend Carnegie Mellon School of Drama and then to New York City, where she studied at the Neighborhood Playhouse in Manhattan. After seven years, she gained a Bachelor of Arts degree from UCLA. After 14 years as an actress, Crawford returned to college, graduating magna cum laude from UCLA and receiving her master's degree from the Annenberg School of Communication at USC. Then she worked in corporate communications at the Los Angeles headquarters of Getty Oil Company.

Career
Crawford appeared in summer stock theater, including a production of Splendor in the Grass. She also acted in a number of Off-Broadway productions, including In Color on Sundays (1958). She also appeared in At Christmas Time (1959) and Dark of the Moon (1959) at the Fred Miller Theater in Milwaukee, and The Moon Is Blue (1960).

In 1960, due to her mother's career in film, Crawford was given a supporting role in the crime drama film Force of Impulse, which was released in 1961. Also in 1961, Crawford was assigned a small role in the musical Wild in the Country, a film starring Elvis Presley. That year, she made a guest appearance on Dean Miller's NBC celebrity interview program Here's Hollywood, promoting the films.

In 1962, she appeared in the play The Complaisant Lover. She played five character parts in Ben Hecht's controversial play Winkelberg. The same year, she appeared on the CBS courtroom drama The Verdict is Yours. In October 1965, she appeared in Neil Simon's Barefoot in the Park, with Myrna Loy, a friend of her mother, before being fired.  She was considered a capable actress, but difficult to work with in the industry, described as 'stubborn' by Loy who stated in her autobiography Being and Becoming that "We didn't have any problems in Barefoot in the Park until she appeared. The idea of Joan's daughter playing the role delighted me until I discovered how recalcitrant this child was...I've never known anyone like her, ever. Her stubbornness was really unbelievable. She would not do a single thing anyone told her to do."  She also had a small role in Faces (1968), a romantic drama directed by John Cassavetes.

Crawford played Joan Borman Kane on the soap opera The Secret Storm in New York from 1968 until 1969. While Crawford was in the hospital recovering from an emergency surgery in October 1968, Joan asked to "fill in" for Christina. She did so without mentioning it to her daughter, "holding the role" for her for four episodes so that the part would not be recast during her absence. Viewership increased 40% during this replacement time, much to Christina's chagrin. Eventually let go from the series, Crawford insisted it was due to her mother's appearance. The producers, however, said that Joan was gracious, professional and brought huge ratings, and that Christina's character and her storyline had simply run its course.

In the early 1970s, Crawford also was given guest appearances on other TV programs, including Medical Center, Marcus Welby, M.D., Matt Lincoln, Ironside and The Sixth Sense.

Later career
After Joan Crawford died in 1977, Crawford and her brother, Christopher, discovered that their mother had disinherited them from her $2 million estate, her will citing "reasons which are well-known to them." Though being estranged from (and no longer financially supported by) their famous mother for years, in November 1977, Crawford and her brother sued Joan Crawford's estate to invalidate their mother's will, which she signed on October 28, 1976. Cathy LaLonde, another Crawford daughter, and her husband, Jerome, the complaint charged, "took deliberate advantage of decedent's seclusion and weakened and distorted mental and physical condition to insinuate themselves" into Joan's favor. A settlement between the parties was reached on July 13, 1979, which provided Crawford and Christopher a combined $55,000 from their mother's estate.

In 1978, Crawford's book Mommie Dearest was released. The book accused her mother of being a cruel, violent, neglectful, and deceitful narcissistic fraud who adopted her children only for wealth and fame after she had been labeled "box office poison" following her firing from MGM studios. In 1981, a movie adaptation of the book was released, starring Faye Dunaway as Joan Crawford, Mara Hobel (Mara Boyd) as very young Christina, and Diana Scarwid as adult Christina Crawford. The film was both a critical and financial failure and garnered five Golden Raspberry Awards, including worst picture.

Christina had no involvement with the making of the film, and has categorically denounced the film as "grotesque" and a work of fiction. Christina has repeatedly stated that the film is highly inaccurate, and that the portrayal of her mother in the film bears little resemblance to the real Joan Crawford, specifically citing that her mother never chopped down a tree with an axe, or beat her with a wire hanger as depicted in the film.

Christina Crawford has published five subsequent books, including "Survivor", "Black Widow," "No Safe Place," "Daughters of The Inquisition," and "Scammed."

After a stroke in 1981, she spent five years in rehabilitation before moving to the Northwest. She ran a bed and breakfast called Seven Springs Farms in Tensed, Idaho, between 1994 and 1999. She formed Seven Springs Press in 1998 to self-publish the 20th-anniversary edition of Mommie Dearest in paperback from the original manuscript and included new material about the years after her graduation from high school.

On July 20, 1998, one of Joan Crawford's other adopted children, Cathy Crawford LaLonde, filed a lawsuit against Christina Crawford for "defamation of character." LaLonde stated in her lawsuit that during the 20th anniversary book tour of Mommie Dearest, Christina publicly claimed to interviewers that LaLonde and her twin sister, Cynthia, were not biological sisters, and that their adoption was never legal. Lalonde stated neither claim by Christina was true, and attached copies of the twin girls' birth certificates and adoption documentation to the lawsuit. The lawsuit was later settled out of court for $5,000 plus court costs.

In 2000, Crawford began working as entertainment manager at the Coeur d'Alene Casino in Idaho, where she worked until 2007. She then wrote and produced a regional TV series, Northwest Entertainment. On November 22, 2009, she was appointed county commissioner in Benewah County, Idaho, by Governor Butch Otter, but she lost her bid for election in November 2010. In 2011, Crawford founded the non-profit Benewah Human Rights Coalition and served as the organization's first president. In 2013, she made a documentary, Surviving Mommie Dearest.

On November 21, 2017, the e-book editions of Mommie Dearest, Survivor, and Daughters of the Inquisition were published through Open Road Integrated Media. She is also currently working with composer David Nehls on a stage musical adaptation of Mommie Dearest, to be produced in regional theater. Crawford is currently writing the third book in her memoir trilogy, following Mommie Dearest and Survivor.

Personal life
Crawford met Harvey Medlinsky, a director and Broadway stage manager, while she was appearing in the Chicago national company of Barefoot in the Park. They were married briefly in the late 1960s. She met her second husband, commercial producer David Koontz, while she was working on a car commercial.  They divorced after ten years of marriage.

Filmography

Books 
 Mommie Dearest (1978) 
 Black Widow: A Novel (1981) 
 Survivor (1988) 
 No Safe Place: The Legacy of Family Violence (1994) 
 Daughters Of The Inquisition: Medieval Madness: Origin and Aftermath (2003) 
 Scammed: A True Story of Christina & The General (2014) 
 Mommie Dearest: Special Edition (2017) ebook 
 Survivor (2017) ebook 
 Daughters of the Inquisition: Medieval Madness: Origin and Aftermath (2017) ebook

References

External links 
 
 

American women novelists
American adoptees
American film actresses
American memoirists
20th-century American novelists
American stage actresses
American television actresses
County commissioners in Idaho
Writers from Los Angeles
Living people
Actresses from Los Angeles
University of California, Los Angeles alumni
University of Southern California alumni
21st-century American novelists
Carnegie Mellon University College of Fine Arts alumni
20th-century American women writers
21st-century American women writers
American women non-fiction writers
21st-century American non-fiction writers
Year of birth missing (living people)